Ira Lloyd Letts (May 29, 1889 – November 24, 1947) was a United States district judge of the United States District Court for the District of Rhode Island.

Education and career

Born in Cortland County, New York, Letts received a Bachelor of Philosophy degree from Brown University in 1913, a Master of Arts degree from the same institution in 1914, and a Bachelor of Laws from Columbia Law School in 1917. He was in private practice in Providence, Rhode Island from 1917 to 1925. He was an Assistant United States Attorney General in the United States Department of Justice from 1925 to 1927.

Federal judicial service

Letts received a recess appointment from President Calvin Coolidge on June 9, 1927, to a seat on the United States District Court for the District of Rhode Island vacated by Judge Arthur Lewis Brown. He was nominated to the same position by President Coolidge on December 6, 1927. He was confirmed by the United States Senate on January 4, 1928, and received his commission the same day. His service terminated on June 24, 1935, due to his resignation.

Later career and death

After his resignation from the federal bench, Letts returned to private practice in Providence from 1935 to 1947. He died on November 24, 1947, in Boston, Massachusetts.

References

Sources
 

1889 births
1947 deaths
Judges of the United States District Court for the District of Rhode Island
United States district court judges appointed by Calvin Coolidge
20th-century American judges
People from Cortland County, New York